The 49th Regiment Illinois Volunteer Infantry was an infantry regiment that served in the Union Army during the American Civil War.

Service
The 49th  Illinois Infantry was organized at Camp Butler, Illinois and mustered into Federal service on 31 December 1861.

The regiment was mustered out on September 9, 1865.

Total strength and casualties
The regiment suffered 7 officers and 72 enlisted men who were killed in action or mortally wounded and 5 officers and 170 enlisted men who died of disease, for a total of 254 fatalities.

Commanders
Colonel William Ralls Morrison - resigned on December 13, 1862.
Colonel William A. Thrush - mustered out with the regiment.
Colonel Phineas Pease

See also
List of Illinois Civil War Units
Illinois in the American Civil War

Notes

References
The Civil War Archive

Units and formations of the Union Army from Illinois
1861 establishments in Illinois
Military units and formations established in 1861
Military units and formations disestablished in 1865